Dr. Rajendra Prasad Central Agricultural University, formerly known as Rajendra Agricultural University, is a public central agriculture university and is recognised as Institute of National Importance by government of India. It is located in Pusa, Samastipur district, Bihar

History
Dr. Rajendra Prasad Central Agricultural University (Earlier, Rajendra Agricultural University) was originally established as India's first-ever Imperial Agriculture Research Institute.

The foundation stone of the Agricultural Research Institute and college was laid by Lord Curzon on 1 April 1905 with the financial assistance of Henry Phipps, Jr., an American philanthropist. Phipps was a family friend of Lady Curzon, the daughter of an American millionaire, and the wife of Lord Curzon, the Viceroy of India. In his speech, the viceroy had expressed his vision that the seed he was planting would soon blossom out, making Pusa the nucleus of agricultural activities, research and education which would not only benefit Bihar and Bengal but the whole of the country and would attract the best of talents from India and abroad. In separate meeting with the Bihar Planters Association, he fervently hoped that the institute would-be of immense service to them in their grave hour of crisis caused by the German Indigo scientist.

Lord Curzon left by the end of 1905 and Lord Minto was his successor. Till the last minute, he had seen through each and every detail of the Pusa project which virtually was his brainchild. Incidentally, one major issue on which he had not agreed was the architecture of the main building, its wings, vaults, and arches but finally, he gave his consent of course with a stint. Rightfully, Pusa received an imperial status in 1918, being renamed as the Imperial Agricultural Research Institute (IARI).

In 1934, after a major earthquake rocked Bihar and which severely damage the main buildings, the Imperial Institute was shifted to the new Pusa campus in New Delhi and that eventually became Indian Agricultural Research Institute. What remained was downgraded to an agricultural research station until 3 December 1970, when the government of Bihar established Rajendra Agricultural University.

On 11 May 2016 Parliament of India passed the Central University Bill. So RAU, Pusa has been upgraded to Central Agricultural University and named as Dr. Rajendra Prasad Central Agricultural University.

Academics
There are five faculties in the university in the disciplines of Agriculture, Veterinary & Animal Sciences, Agricultural Engineering, Basic Sciences, Humanities & Home Science, besides the college of agriculture, fisheries and institute of dairy technology. The university offers six undergraduate degree programmes, 14 postgraduate programmes and 4 PhD programmes. It is also providing 2-year professional degree programs name MBA (Agribusiness Management) and 

MBA (Rural Management) for agricultural and allied sector graduates.

Departments of University 

Agronomy
Horticulture
Entomology
Agricultural Economics
Nematology
Soil Science
Extension Education
Plant Breeding and  Genetics
Forestry
Plant Pathology	
Agril Biotechnology and Molecular Biology
Microbiology
Soil and  Water Engineering
Farm Machinery &  Power
Processing & Food Engineering
Agribusiness Management
Rural Management

Constituent Colleges of University 
College of Agricultural Engineering and Technology
Trihut College of Agriculture
College of Fisheries
College of Community Science
College of Basic Sciences & Humanities
Post Graduate College of Agriculture
School of Agribusiness & Rural Management
Pt. Deen Dayal Upadhyay College of Horticulture Forestry

References

External links
 
 School of Agribusiness and Rural Mangement
 Welcome to Agricultural Education Portal (icar.gov.in)

Agricultural universities and colleges in Bihar
Samastipur district
Samastipur
Memorials to Rajendra Prasad
1905 establishments in India
Educational institutions established in 1905